The 2012 NASCAR K&N Pro Series East was the 26th season of the K&N Pro Series East. It began with the Widow Wax 125 presented by SealWrap Repair Tape at Bristol Motor Speedway on March 17, and ended with the Classic 3 Championship at Rockingham Speedway on November 3. Max Gresham entered the season as the defending Drivers' Champion.

Kyle Larson won the championship after earning 2 victories during the season, along with 8 top fives and 12 top tens. Larson finished just 14 points ahead of his closest rival in the points standings, Corey LaJoie. LaJoie finished with 5 victories on the season, along with 10 top fives and 10 top tens. Third place in the championship went to Brett Moffitt, who took two victories on the season. Nelson Piquet Jr., Darrell Wallace Jr., Chase Elliott, Cale Conley, and Tyler Reddick each collected a victory.

Schedule

Notes

Results and standings

Races

Drivers' championship

(key) Bold - Pole position awarded by time. Italics - Pole position set by final practice results or rainout. * – Most laps led. ** – All laps led.

Notes
1 – Scored points towards the K&N Pro Series West.

See also

 2012 NASCAR Sprint Cup Series
 2012 NASCAR Nationwide Series
 2012 NASCAR Camping World Truck Series
 2012 ARCA Racing Series
 2012 NASCAR Canadian Tire Series
 2012 NASCAR Toyota Series
2012 NASCAR Stock V6 Series
2012 Racecar Euro Series

References

ARCA Menards Series East